Endogenous retrovirus group V member 2, envelope is a protein that in humans is encoded by the ERVV-2 gene.

Function

Many human endogenous retrovirus (HERV) families are expressed in normal placental tissue at high levels, suggesting that HERVs are functionally important in reproduction. This gene is part of an HERV provirus on human chromosome 19 that has inactivating mutations in the gag and pol genes. This envelope glycoprotein gene appears to have been selectively preserved. The gene's protein product is expressed in the placenta and acts as a syncytin in Old World monkeys, but has lost the fusogenic activity in humans and other primate lineages.

References

Further reading